Dark Star Safari (2002) is a written account of a trip taken by author Paul Theroux from Cairo to Cape Town via trains, buses, cars, and armed convoy.  Theroux had lived in Africa as a young and idealistic early member of the Peace Corps and part of the reason for this trip was to assess the impact on Africa of the many years of aid from Western countries.  His assessment is generally critical of the long-term impact of aid programs.

Throughout the duration of the trip Theroux describes the writing of an erotic novella. This novella was eventually published in 2003, amongst a collection of short stories, as "The Stranger at the Palazzo D'Oro".

References

External links
Booknotes interview with Theroux on Dark Star Safari, May 18, 2003.
Official site
Rossouw, Henk. "Classic review: Dark Star Safari", The Christian Science Monitor, 27 September 2009.
Kirkus Reviews. "Dark Star Safari", [Kirkus Reviews], 15 December 2002.
Gerhart, Gail M. "Dark Star Safari: Overland From Cairo to Cape Town", Foreign Affairs, November/December 2003.

2002 non-fiction books
Books by Paul Theroux
Books about Africa
Houghton Mifflin books
American travel books